is a Japanese politician of the Constitutional Democratic Party and a member of the House of Councillors in the Diet (national legislature). A native of Hokkaidō and law graduate of Hokkai Gakuen University, she was elected for the first time in 2007.

References

External links 
  in Japanese.

1947 births
Living people
Members of the House of Councillors (Japan)
Female members of the House of Councillors (Japan)
People from Mikasa, Hokkaido
Politicians from Hokkaido
Constitutional Democratic Party of Japan politicians
Democratic Party of Japan politicians
21st-century Japanese politicians
21st-century Japanese women politicians